Penhalurick is a hamlet in the parish of Stithians, Cornwall, England.

There is also a Cornish surname Penhallurick (with variants Penhalurick, &c.); it is well recorded in Cornish parish registers from the late 16th century. Among living bearers of the name is Robert Penhallurick, a linguist specialising in the English language.

References

Hamlets in Cornwall